Durdhara was the Queen of Chandragupta Maurya, the founder of the 4th-century BCE Maurya Empire of ancient India, according to the 12th century CE Jain text Parishishtaparvan by Hemachandra. She is stated by this text to be the mother of the second Mauryan emperor, Bindusara also known as Amitraghāta.

Nothing is mentioned or known about Durdhara outside of this legend written 1,600 years after Chandragupta's era. Other sources, such as the Burmese Buddhist records do not corroborate the Jain legend. Megasthenes, the Greek ambassador in the final years of Chandragupta's court, does not mention Durdhara nor use the name Bindusara, but refers to Chandragupta's successor as Amitrochates, while the Hindu scholar Patanjali calls him Amitraghata (meaning "vanquisher of foes"). Scholars consider the Bindusara of Jain texts to be the same as Amitraghata.

In popular culture
 Durdhara was portrayed by Nidhi Tikko in Chandragupta Maurya (2011 TV series)
 Saanvi Talwar played Durdhara in the 2016 historical fiction series  Chandra Nandini.  
 Pranali Ghoghare and Aditi Sanwal portrayed Durdhara in Chandragupta Maurya (2018 TV series)

Sources

References

Mauryan empresses
4th-century BC women
Year of birth unknown
4th-century BC Indian people